Aghnaskeagh Cairns is a chambered cairn and portal tomb forming a National Monument in County Louth, Ireland.

Location

History and archaeology
The two cairns may have been connected by a gallery.

Portal tomb
The northern cairn is a dolmen (portal tomb) with the capstone missing. Two portal stones (2.8 m / 9 ft high) and a back stone remain. Six Bronze Age cist burials were later added. Archeologists found potsherds, cremated bone, food vessels and a blue glass bead on the site, as well as the remains of blackberries under one of the cists, presumably as grave-goods.

Chambered cairn
The southern cairn is a chambered cairn with four cists at the eastern end. Excavations revealed cremated bone, potsherds and scrapers. A burial was also made here in the  early Christian era.

References

Archaeological sites in County Louth
National Monuments in County Louth